HD 38529 (138 G. Orionis) is a binary star approximately 138 light-years away in the constellation of Orion.

HD 38529 A
HD 38529 A is a yellow subgiant star, which has also been classified as a main sequence dwarf of spectral type G4V. It is about 40% more massive than the Sun. Two substellar companions are known in orbit around this star, including one with a mass near the deuterium fusion limit that is often used as the dividing line between giant planets and brown dwarfs. There is a debris disk located at least 86 astronomical units from the star. Its orbit is probably mildly misaligned with the planetary orbits, by 21−45°.

Planetary system
In 2002, the planet HD 38529 b was discovered orbiting the star HD 38529 A by Debra Fischer and collaborators who detected it using the doppler spectroscopy technique. It has a mass 78% that of Jupiter and orbits very close to the star, just beyond the distance limit for hot Jupiters. One year later, a massive superjovian HD 38529 c was found orbiting at 3.68 AU with a minimum mass of 12.7 Jupiter masses. Astrometric measurements from the Hipparcos satellite gave a best fit inclination of 160° and a true mass 37 times that of Jupiter, turning this planet into a brown dwarf. Further study of the system using Hubble Space Telescope astrometry revised the mass of HD 38529 c downwards to 17.7 Jupiter masses and suggested the presence of an additional planet, orbiting in the gap between HD 38529 b and c. The possible third planet was refuted after additional radial velocity measurements were collected. A 2022 study estimated an even lower mass of 10.4 Jupiter masses for HD 38529 c. The authors state that their mass estimate is consistent with previous estimates, but with higher precision.

HD 38529 B
HD 38529 B is a common proper motion stellar companion to HD 38529 A at a projected distance of about ~12000 Astronomical units. The star is a red dwarf of spectral type M3.0V. Wide binary stars such as HD 38529 AB have been shown to be vulnerable to disruption by galactic tides and perturbations by passing stars.

See also
 List of extrasolar planets
 HD 168443

References

External links

 Extrasolar Planet Interactions by Rory Barnes & Richard Greenberg, Lunar and Planetary Lab, University of Arizona

Brown dwarfs
G-type subgiants
038529
027253
1988
M-type main-sequence stars
Orion (constellation)
Planetary systems with two confirmed planets
Binary stars
Durchmusterung objects